Southport is a city in Brunswick County, North Carolina, United States, near the mouth of the Cape Fear River. Its population was 3,828 as of the 2018 census. The mayor is Joseph P. Hatem.

Southport is the location of the North Carolina Fourth of July Festival, which attracts 40,000 to 50,000 visitors annually.

History
The Southport area was explored in the 1500s by Spanish explorers. During the 18th century, British settlements along the Carolina coast lacked fortifications to protect against pirates and privateers, and numerous Spanish attackers exploited this weakness. In response to these attacks, Governor Gabriel Johnston in 1744 appointed a committee to select the best location to construct a fort for the defense of the Cape Fear River region. It was determined that the fort should be constructed at a site at the mouth of the Cape Fear River. During the same year, France declared war against Britain, later known as King George's War, increasing the fort's need. Further, increasingly bold Spanish privateer raids led the North Carolina General Assembly to authorize the construction of "Johnston's Fort" in April 1745, which would come to be known as Fort Johnston. The governor of South Carolina agreed to lend ten small cannons for the fort, and the legislature, in spring 1748, appropriated 2,000 pounds for construction costs, and construction finally began. Southport developed around Fort Johnston.

Southport was founded as the town of Smithville in 1792. Joshua Potts had requested the formation of a town adjacent to Fort Johnston, and the North Carolina General Assembly formed a commission of five men to administer its founding. The town was named after Benjamin Smith, a colonel in the Continental Army during the Revolutionary War and later governor of North Carolina. Smithville grew as a fishing village and through supporting military activity. Smithville was the county seat of Brunswick County from 1808 to 1977. In an effort to promote the town as a major shipping port, Smithville was renamed Southport in 1887. Smithville Township, in which Southport lies, and other local landmarks, such as the cemetery, retain the Smithville name. 

Interest in making Southport a major commercial port then prompted efforts to connect it via rail to Wilmington and the Atlantic Coast Line/Seaboard Air Line Railroad systems.  After some 25 years of failed effort by various  entrepreneurs, the Wilmington, Brunswick and Southern Railroad began operation in 1911. Running northwest out of Southport to Bolivia, the line then turned northeast towards Navassa where it joined the existing rail network.  Poorly constructed, beset with continued revenue shortfalls and facing intense and growing competition from trucks/automobiles, the 30 mile long railroad ceased operation in 1945. 
 
Ten years later, it would be the U.S. Government who would construct the present rail line from the Military Ocean Terminal Sunny Point just north of Southport to the interior rail system along a different, more direct path.  Thus, while the renaming to Southport did not achieve its goal of making the town a major shipping port,  Southport instead became known for its relaxed atmosphere and Victorian era seaside charm.

Geography
North Carolina Highway 211 enters the city from the north as North Howe Street and travels south to one block north of the waterfront, where it turns east as East Moore Street, leading northeast to the city limits, where it turns east again as Ferry Road on its way to the western terminus of the Southport–Fort Fisher ferry across the Cape Fear River.

Climate
Southport has a humid subtropical climate (Cfa). Summers in Southport are very hot and humid while winters are very mild by North Carolina standards.

Demographics

2020 census

As of the 2020 United States census, there were 3,971 people, 1,434 households, and 942 families residing in the city.

2000 census
As of the census of 2000, there were 2,351 people, 1,095 households, and 676 families residing in the city. The population density was 1,059.0 people per square mile (408.9/km2). There were 1,292 housing units at an average density of 582.0 per square mile (224.7/km2). The racial makeup of the city was 76.61% White, 21.78% African American, 0.43% Native American, 0.17% Asian, 0.09% Pacific Islander, 0.21% from other races, and 0.72% from two or more races. Hispanic or Latino of any race were 1.45% of the population.

There were 1,095 households, out of which 19.3% had children under the age of 18 living with them, 45.3% were married couples living together, 14.0% had a female householder with no husband present, and 38.2% were non-families. Of all households, 35.3% were made up of individuals, and 16.2% had someone living alone who was 65 years of age or older. The average household size was 2.08 and the average family size was 2.65.

In the city, the population was spread out, with 17.9% under the age of 18, 5.4% from 18 to 24, 21.0% from 25 to 44, 31.0% from 45 to 64, and 24.7% who were 65 years of age or older. The median age was 49 years. For every 100 females, there were 82.7 males. For every 100 females age 18 and over, there were 79.8 males.

The median income for a household in the city was $33,714, and the median income for a family was $45,714. Males had a median income of $34,167 versus $22,857 for females.

The per capita income for the city was $23,059. About 7.1% of families and 12.9% of the population were below the poverty line, including 19.1% of those under age 18 and 14.6% of those age 65 or over.

Economy
This plant is the same generation and design as the Fukushima Daiichi plant in Japan. Following the Fukushima Daiichi nuclear meltdown, temporary flood prevention updates, called "cliff edge barriers" to make doors at the facility water tight, were installed at Brunswick to prevent flooding from Hurricane Florence from causing a disaster similar to Fukushima Daiichi. On Thursday, September 13, 2018, before Hurricane Florence made landfall at Wrightsville Beach, Duke Energy shut down the first reactor in the early morning and the second reactor in the afternoon, approximately two hours before tropical storm-force winds at the plant.

Media
The city is serviced by the newspaper The State Port Pilot. Radio stations WAZO/107.5 & WJSL-LP/100.7 are licensed to Southport.

The city of Southport has been the location the TV series Revenge and Under the Dome. Films made in Southport include I Know What You Did Last Summer, Summer Catch, Domestic Disturbance, Crimes of the Heart, Mary and Martha, Nights in Rodanthe, A Walk to Remember  and Safe Haven.

See also
Dosher Memorial Hospital

References

External links

 City of Southport official website

Cities in North Carolina
Cities in Brunswick County, North Carolina
Populated places established in 1792
Cape Fear (region)
Populated coastal places in North Carolina